Mahomet-Seymour Community Unit School District 3 also known as Mahomet-Seymour Community Schools and Mahomet-Seymour CUSD 3 is a school district in Champaign County, Illinois. The district has 2,980 students and 183 instructors spread over five schools.

Schools

Middletown Prairie Elementary School
Middletown Prairie enrolls students in grades Pre-K to 2nd.

Lincoln Trail Elementary School
Lincoln Trail has students enrolled over three grade levels (3rd-5th).

Mahomet-Seymour Junior High School
Built in 1961, the building that is now MSJH was originally Mahomet-Seymour High School. In 1981 the high school moved to its current building. MSJH has gone through many renovations and additions, including ten new rooms in 1994. As of the 2004-2005 school year, there are 631 students enrolled at MSJH over three grade levels (6th-8th). The floor in the Blue Gym was originally the flooring at the University of Illinois' State Farm Center (originally Assembly Hall).

Mahomet-Seymour High School

Reaction to COVID-19 outbreak
In 2020, the district returned to activity at the start of the school year. The district offered both in-person and virtual instruction. Each school had differing plans, however all schools did not have in-person instruction on Monday. As of November 12, 2020, the Champaign Urbana Public Health Department recommended that all schools in Champaign County close as soon as possible.

References

School districts in Illinois
Education in Champaign County, Illinois